Eucithara nana is a small sea snail, a marine gastropod mollusk in the family Mangeliidae.

Description
The length of the shell attains 5.3 mm, its diameter 2.2 mm.

Distribution
This marine species occurs off the Philippines.

References

  Reeve, L.A. 1846. Monograph of the genus Mangelia. pls 1-8 in Reeve, L.A. (ed). Conchologia Iconica. London : L. Reeve & Co. Vol. 3.

External links
  Tucker, J.K. 2004 Catalog of recent and fossil turrids (Mollusca: Gastropoda). Zootaxa 682:1-1295
 Kilburn R.N. 1992. Turridae (Mollusca: Gastropoda) of southern Africa and Mozambique. Part 6. Subfamily Mangeliinae, section 1. Annals of the Natal Museum, 33: 461–575

nana
Gastropods described in 1846